Alphonse Higelin (26 April 1897 – 21 June 1981) was a French gymnast who competed in the 1920 Summer Olympics and in the 1924 Summer Olympics.

References

1897 births
1981 deaths
Sportspeople from Mulhouse
French male artistic gymnasts
Olympic gymnasts of France
Gymnasts at the 1920 Summer Olympics
Gymnasts at the 1924 Summer Olympics
Olympic silver medalists for France
Olympic bronze medalists for France
Olympic medalists in gymnastics
Medalists at the 1924 Summer Olympics
Medalists at the 1920 Summer Olympics
20th-century French people